"Answer Me" is a popular song, originally titled "Mütterlein", with German lyrics by Gerhard Winkler and Fred Rauch. "Mütterlein" was published on 19 April 1952. English lyrics were written by Carl Sigman, and the song was published as "Answer Me" in New York on October 13, 1953. Contemporary recordings of the English lyric by Frankie Laine and David Whitfield both topped the UK Singles Chart in 1953.

"Mütterlein" 
Mütterlein, an old-fashioned term of endearment for a mother in German, was the title used by Gerhard Winkler for a song marking his mother's 75th birthday in 1952. The first artist to record it was Leila Negra, and there were also versions in Danish, Swedish, Finnish and Norwegian. Fred Rauch later wrote new German lyrics, and titled it "Glaube Mir (Answer Me)". This version sold half a million copies for Wolfgang Sauer, a singer and pianist.

"Answer Me"

Sigman originally wrote his English lyrics as a religious-themed song, "Answer Me", in which the first line reads 'Answer me, Lord above', as a question posed to God about why the singer has lost his lover. This lyric was recorded by Frankie Laine in Hollywood on June 22, 1953. Laine's version did not chart when released in his native America, where it was titled "Answer Me, Lord Above".

British light operatic tenor David Whitfield recorded the song on September 23 the same year. Despite competition from other recordings of "Answer Me", only the two versions by Whitfield and Laine appeared on the UK Singles Chart. Both were released in the UK in October 1953.

Whitfield's recording of "Answer Me" first entered the UK chart on October 10, whilst Laine's (released in the UK simply as "Answer Me") appeared two weeks later. The song was banned by the BBC after complaints, owing to the religious nature of the lyrics. Bunny Lewis, Whitfield's manager and producer, asked songwriter Carl Sigman to amend his lyric. Rather than asking the question to God about why the singer had lost his love, the lyric was instead addressed directly to the lost lover. In the new lyric, "Answer me, Lord above..." was changed to "Answer me, oh my love...", with other appropriate changes. This revised version was recorded by Whitfield on October 27. On November 6, his version of "Answer Me" reached No. 1 in the UK in its fourth week on chart.

On 13 November 1953, for the first time in UK Singles Chart history, one version of a song was knocked off the top spot by another version of the same song, when Frankie Laine's "Answer Me" made No. 1 in its third week on chart, deposing Whitfield's version after a week. Four weeks later, on December 11, whilst Laine was still at No. 1, Whitfield returned to No. 1 with "Answer Me" for a second and final week, with both records sharing the No. 1 position; this was the first time in British chart history that two versions of the same song were jointly listed at No. 1. In total, Laine's "Answer Me" spent eight weeks at the top of the UK charts.

Other contemporary recordings
In October 1953, alongside the hit versions by David Whitfield and Frankie Laine, two versions of "Answer Me" by female singers were released in the UK, by Anne Shelton with The George Mitchell Choir and Jean Campbell. Other recordings available in the UK during the song's period of chart success were by Monty Norman, Harry Farmer (organ), Reggie Goff, Victor Silvester and his Ballroom Orchestra, and Nat 'King' Cole. On the UK's sheet music charts, "Answer Me" first charted on October 17, 1953. On November 7, its fourth week on chart, it reached No. 1, where it would spend ten weeks (including one week jointly with "I Saw Mommy Kissing Santa Claus").

Frankie Laine re-recorded "Answer Me" with the revised secular lyric in Hollywood on 29 December 1953. This version, titled "Answer Me, My Love", was not released until it appeared on the 1955 LP Lovers' Laine. He would record the song again twice more at future sessions. On December 9, 1964, with orchestra arranged and conducted by Ralph Carmichael, Laine recorded "Answer Me, O Lord" in Hollywood. This version was issued on his album I Believe, which consisted of religious material. In January 1982, "Answer Me, O Lord" was recorded by Laine with the Don Jackson Orchestra and released by Ronco the same year on an album of his re-recorded hits entitled The World Of Frankie Laine.

The original Nat King Cole recording, titled "Answer Me, My Love", was released by Capitol Records (catalog number 2687). This recording first reached the Billboard Best Seller chart on February 24, 1954, and lasted for 19 weeks on the chart, peaking at No. 6. It was the only version of the song to chart in America.

Recorded versions
 
The Bachelors (1969) - featured on the LP The World of The Bachelors Vol 3
Gene Ammons 
Petula Clark (1965) - from the album The Other Man's Grass Is Always Greener (1968)
Nat King Cole (1954)
Harry Connick, Jr. (2009)
Bing Crosby 
Barbara Dickson (1976) - became her first UK top 10 hit, peaking at No. 9
Franck Pourcel (1983) - featured on the LP In a Nostalgia Mood
Renée Fleming
The Happenings 
Bobby Hatfield
Engelbert Humperdinck 
Frankie Laine (1953)
Gisele MacKenzie 
Joni Mitchell (2000) - from the album Both Sides Now
Ray Peterson (1960)
Gene Pitney 
P. J. Proby (1965)
Johnny Rivers
Don Shirley 
Ray Stevens (1968)
Jerry Vale (1972)
David Whitfield (1953) - two versions, with different lyrics
Bryan Ferry
Betty Buckley
Roy Orbison
The Harptones (1960)
Tierney Sutton (2012)
Mark Wynter (1964)
Will Young (2016)

German versions
 Leila Negra
 Rudi Schuricke 
 Wolfgang Sauer (1954) as "Glaube mir"

Other performances
The song was performed in concert (but not recorded) by Bob Dylan in 1991.
The song is in the Keith Jarrett live repertoire; he has performed it at least 15 times with his trio and solo from 2010 onwards.
See Keith Jarrett Live in Budapest 2020

See also

List of number-one singles from the 1950s (UK)

References

 

1952 songs
1953 singles
1976 singles
Nat King Cole songs
Pop ballads
Songs written by Carl Sigman
Barbara Dickson songs
David Whitfield songs
Frankie Laine songs
UK Singles Chart number-one singles
Christmas number-one singles in the United Kingdom
1950s ballads
Columbia Records singles
Decca Records singles